Lindsey Brooke Yamasaki (born June 2, 1980) is an American former professional women's basketball player.

Life and career
Yamasaki was born in Oregon City, Oregon, to Syd and Kriss Yamasaki. She has a sister named Britt, and a brother named Kobi. Lindsey attended Oregon City High School, where she led the women's basketball team to four Oregon state championships and finished #1 in the USA Today national rankings for three years. She was one of the most sought-after recruits for college basketball when she graduated in 1998 and was named the most highly recruited female athlete of 1998. Yamasaki was named a WBCA All-American. She participated in the WBCA High School All-America Game, where she scored sixteen points, and earned MVP honors.

On full scholarship at Stanford University, Yamasaki led the team to the Pac-10 regular season championship in her senior season, 2001–2002. Her Stanford women's basketball teams made the NCAA Division I Women's Basketball tournaments every year, but never won more than two games in the tournament. Yamasaki's 4-year statistics at Stanford were 13.9 points per game, 44.3% field goal percentage, 38.9% 3-point field goal percentage.

During the 2002 WNBA Draft, the 6-foot-2-inch Yamasaki was the 13th pick in the 2nd round (29th overall) to the now-defunct Miami Sol, averaging 3.5 points per game in 15 games in 2002. In 2003, she played 24 games for the New York Liberty averaging 0.7 points. She also played in the National Women's Basketball League for the San Jose Spiders, in the Turkish Women's Basketbol League for Ceyhan Belediyespor and Botas Spor, as well as for the San Antonio Silver Stars where she tore her right Achilles in June 2005. In 2006, she trained with the Seattle Storm in pre-season and was released by the team in May 2006, after which she decided to retire.

In 2008, Yamasaki was named as the first head coach of the first ever women's basketball team at the Academy of Art University in San Francisco.

Stanford statistics

Source

USA Basketball
Yamasaki was selected to be a member of the team representing the USA at the 2001 World University Games held in Beijing, China. After winning the opening game easily, the USA team faced Canada and lost a close game 68–67. The USA team defeated Japan to earn a spot in the quarterfinals. The USA team fell behind by 12 points against undefeated Russia, but came back to win the game by eleven points. The next game was against the unbeaten host team China, and the USA team won 89–78. The USA team won their next two games to set up the gold medal game; a rematch against the host team. China would stay close early, but the USA team prevailed and won the gold medal with a score of 87–67. Yamasaki averaged 6.9 points per game.

References

External links
 An unofficial fansite
 Lindsey's WNBA Player Profile
 Academy of Art University press release

1980 births
Living people
Academy of Art University faculty
American expatriate basketball people in Turkey
American sportspeople of Japanese descent
American women's basketball players
Basketball players from Oregon
Miami Sol players
New York Liberty players
Sportspeople from Oregon City, Oregon
Small forwards
Stanford Cardinal women's basketball players
Stanford Cardinal women's volleyball players
Universiade gold medalists for the United States
Universiade medalists in basketball
American women academics